Ana Rivas Logan (born May 16, 1961) is a politician from the state of Florida. She served one term in the Florida House of Representatives, representing parts of Miami-Dade County as a Republican. After decennial redistricting drew her into the same Kendall-based district as fellow Representative José Félix Díaz, Rivas Logan lost the 2012 primary election to Díaz. Before serving in the Florida House, Rivas Logan was a member of the Miami-Dade County School Board from 2004 to 2010. She represented the 7th district.

She earned her bachelor's degree in Computer Science from Florida International University and a master's degree in the same discipline from Nova Southeastern University.

In February 2014, she announced she was leaving the Republican Party and becoming a Democrat, citing Republicans' growing hostility to immigrants and women's issues.

In 2016, she declared as a candidate for the Florida Senate in the 40th district, but later withdrew from the race to care for her parents. In May 2017, she announced she was running again for the 40th district, in a special election to replace resigned Senator Frank Artiles. She lost the Democratic primary to Annette Taddeo, 71 to 29%.

References

External links
Myfloridahouse

Followthemoney.org

1961 births
Hispanic and Latino American state legislators in Florida
Living people
Florida Republicans
Florida Democrats
Members of the Florida House of Representatives
American politicians of Cuban descent
Women state legislators in Florida
Hispanic and Latino American women in politics
School board members in Florida
21st-century American women